The Atlético Mineiro–Cruzeiro rivalry, known as the Clássico Mineiro ("Mineiro Derby") is an association football rivalry between Atlético Mineiro and Cruzeiro from Belo Horizonte. It is one of the fiercest in Brazilian and South American football.

History
Atlético was founded in the early years of the 20th Century, on March 25, 1908. Cruzeiro was founded 13 years later, on January 2, 1921, among the Belo Horizonte's Italian community, then known as Yale and later renamed Palestra Italia. In 1942, because of the enmity between Brazil and Italy in the World War II, Palestra had to change their name and the president chose Ypiranga. Other council members disagreed and changed the name to Cruzeiro.

The first encounter between the two took place on April 17, 1921, with Palestra winning by 3–0. The first championship game between the two took place on May 15, 1921, Atlético winning by 2–1.

Atlético and Cruzeiro star in one of the greatest rivalries in the world. The two clubs from Belo Horizonte monopolize the Campeonato Mineiro, and have clashed in decisive matches in the Brasileirão, Copa do Brasil and continental CONMEBOL competitions of.

In 2014, the rivals decided the finals of 2014 Copa do Brasil, the first at national level to feature both Belo Horizonte clubs. The first game took place at Estádio Independência and Atlético won 2–0. In the second match, at Mineirão, with Cruzeiro as the home team, Galo won again, Atlético won  1-0, being crowned champions of the competition.

Statistics

Games (Atlético Mineiro Version)

Games (Cruzeiro Version)

List of games

Historic routs

Supporters 

According to a Datafolha survey, and reproduced by Globoesporte.com, the results are these:

Atlético: 2% (5 million people).	
 Cruzeiro: 3% (7.6 million people).

Source: Datafolha

According to a survey by IBOPE, and reproduced by Globoesporte.com, the results are these:

Atlético: 3,5% (7.0 million people).	
 Cruzeiro: 3,1% (6,2 million people).

Source: Ibope

Concurrence 

Source: Superesportes

Titles comparison

Note: Although Cruzeiro considers itself champions of the Campeonato Mineiro in 1926, officially the Atlético Mineiro is the only official champion of this competition. Making officially Cruzeiro have 38 Campeonatos Mineiros.

References

Cruzeiro Esporte Clube
Clube Atlético Mineiro
Football in Minas Gerais
Brazilian football derbies